Alexander Nabutovsky  is a leading Canadian mathematician specializing  in differential geometry, geometric calculus of variations and quantitative aspects of topology of manifolds. He is a professor at the University of Toronto Department of Mathematics.

Nabutovsky earned a Ph.D. degree from the Weizmann Institute of Science
in 1993; his advisor was Shmuel Kiro.

He was an invited speaker on "Geometry" at International Congress of Mathematicians, 2010 in Hyderabad.

References

External links

Living people
Canadian mathematicians
Academic staff of the University of Toronto
Geometers
Weizmann Institute of Science alumni
Year of birth missing (living people)